18 Fingers of Death! is a 2006 parody kung-fu film made, written, directed and starring James Lew. Also starring are Maurice Patton as Ronald Mack, Pat Morita as Mr. Lee, and Lisa Arturo as Sushi Cue. Lori Beth Denberg also appears in the film.

References

External links
 
 Amazon.com entry
 Movie Info on New York Times

2006 films
American parody films
2000s English-language films
2000s parody films
Kung fu films
2006 comedy films
2000s American films